The 2009 Dunlop World Challenge was a professional tennis tournament played on indoor carpet courts. It was the second edition of the tournament which was part of the 2009 ATP Challenger Tour and the 2009 ITF Women's Circuit. It took place in Toyota, Japan between 23 and 29 November 2009.

Singles main-draw entrants

Seeds

 Rankings are as of November 16, 2009.

Other entrants
The following players received wildcards into the singles main draw:
  Hiroki Kondo
  Hiroki Moriya
  Arata Onozawa
  Kento Takeuchi

The following players received entry from the qualifying draw:
  Chen Ti
  Yuichi Ito
  Tasuku Iwami
  Jun Woong-sun

Champions

Singles

 Uladzimir Ignatik def.  Tatsuma Ito, 7–6(7), 7–6(3)

Doubles

 Andis Juška /  Alexander Kudryavtsev def.  Alexey Kedryuk /  Junn Mitsuhashi, 6–4, 7–6(6)

External links
Official website (Japanese language)
ITF search 
2009 Draws